In mathematics, O(n) may refer to:

 O(n), the orthogonal group
 Big O notation, indicating the order of growth of some quantity as a function of n or the limiting behavior of a function, e.g. in computational complexity theory
 The nth tensor power of Serre's twisting sheaf